Harish Mehta may refer to:
Harish C. Mehta, Indian historian
Harish S. Mehta, Indian businessman